Patrick Lee (born 26 September 1944) is a former Irish Fine Gael politician and medical doctor.

He first stood for election as a Fine Gael candidate at the 1987 general election for the Dublin Central constituency but was not successful. He stood again at the 1989 general election and was elected as a Fine Gael Teachta Dála (TD). He lost his seat at the 1992 general election.

References

1944 births
Living people
Local councillors in Dublin (city)
Fine Gael TDs
20th-century Irish medical doctors
Members of the 26th Dáil
Politicians from County Dublin